CSB Bank Limited (erstwhile Catholic Syrian Bank Limited) is an Indian private sector bank with its headquarters at Thrissur, Kerala, India. The bank has a network of over 560 branches and more than 390 ATMs across India.

History

CSB was founded on 26 November 1920, and opened for business on 1 January 1921 with an authorized capital of ₹ 5 lakhs and a paid up capital of ₹ 45,270.

In 1969, it was included in the Second Schedule of Reserve Bank of India Act and the Bank became a Scheduled Bank. The bank achieved Scheduled Bank - A Class, status by 1975.

In Dec 2016, RBI allowed Fairfax Financial Holdings to acquire 51% of the bank and in Feb 2018, Fairfax India (via FIH Mauritius Investments Ltd) acquired 51% of the bank for Rs.1180 Crores.

The terms of investment includes a mandatory 5-year lock-in period and 15-year time period to pare the stake in multiple tranches as per RBI's norms.

As of March 2019, the bank had significant presence in Maharashtra, Tamil Nadu, Kerala and Karnataka with a customer base of nearly 1.3 million people and it's credit portfolio focused on agriculture, MSMEs, education, and housing.

The bank went public on Dec 4, 2019 and the shares are listed in BSE and NSE.

Sponsorship
Kerala based I-League club Gokulam Kerala FC is being sponsored by CSB Bank.

See also

 Banking in India
 List of banks in India
 Reserve Bank of India
 Indian Financial System Code
 List of largest banks
 List of companies of India
 Make in India

References

External links
 CSB Bank Official Website
 CSB NetBanking

Banks established in 1920
Banks based in Thrissur
Private sector banks in India
Indian companies established in 1920
Companies listed on the National Stock Exchange of India
Companies listed on the Bombay Stock Exchange